Thiago Moio Pace (born 6 April 1988) also known as Thiago Piraju, is a Brazilian footballer who plays as a midfielder for ASD Luogosanto Football club.

Club career 
He began his career at the local brazilian football club in the youth teams of Itararé (from São Paulo, Brazil), in 2000. Thus, he alternated between Itararé and Portuguesa Londrinense (from Paraná, Brazil) until his professionalization in 2011, with Guaçuano.

In 2013, Thiago joined Lanexang United F.C. in the middle of the season. At the end of it, he was loaned for half a season to Thai club Nakhon Phanom F.C. He returned to Lanexang for the end of the 2014 season, before returning to Brazil.

Thiago returned to Brazil and played for Imperatriz, where he was champion of the Maranhão Championship. In 2016, he went to Araioses and in 2017 to Humaitá. In 2018 he transferred to Força e Luz and then to Icasa. He still played for Morrinhos before going abroad again.

In June 2019, Thiago started his career at Italian club Policoro, but soon left for Gangi. In August 2020, he signed for Gallipoli Football, and a year later, he agreed a deal to join another Italian club, US Tortolì Calcio 1953.

He also played for Monastir Kosmoto until December 2022, when he signed a contract with the Italian club ASD Luogosanto. Thiago currently plays as a midfielder for the club.

Honours 

 CAMPEONATO MARANHENSE:2015

References

External links 
 Profile at Soccerway

Brazilian footballers
Association football midfielders
1988 births
Living people